Galaxy Public is located in Gyaneshwar, Kathmandu, Nepal and educates over 2,500 students. Established in 1986, it offers education across levels of Kindergarten to School Leaving Certificate level, along with 10+2 in Science and Commerce specialization.

A common curriculum made up of moral education, English, Nepali, mathematics, science, environmental science, social studies, arts & crafts, and computer studies are taught in all the classes. Pre-school consists of two levels: Prep I and Prep II. The minimum age for admission into Prep I is three years. For Prep II it is four years. Informal education is imparted to students in pre-school. The children are made to do a lot of oral work, indulge in various kinds of activities, play games, do simple practicals, go for excursions, and observe different phenomena. Teachers use several audio-visual aids in order to demonstrate the lessons. The aim of the curriculum at this stage is to make children creative and innovative. To develop good toilet habits, to encourage children to eat healthy foods, and to make them aware of the benefits of good health. The minimum age for admission to the Kindergarten class is 5 years. Formal education starts from this class. Apart from oral work, activities, games, practicals, and excursions children are introduced to subjects like English, Nepali, Maths, Science, Social Studies, and Computer Studies.

Residential hostel and dormitories
The school hostel provides students residing outside Kathmandu valley with an opportunity to study. The hostel is under the direct supervision of the Principal, and is looked after by hostel wardens and matrons. The school tries to draw inspiration from the Gurukul system of education where the students live inside the school premises to grasp traditional Hindu values under the able guidance of the gurus.

The school has several hostels where students learn to live together, learn together and play together. The students follow a fixed time table on all days of the week. Their day begins at 5:30 a.m. and ends at 8:30 p.m. Study classes are held in the mornings and evenings. The time table ensures that all students get ample opportunity to take part in co-curricular activities.

Medical facilities
Children's health is supervised by a medical team. The school has a 10-bed infirmary under the charge of a nursing sister. The children undergo routine medical check-ups. In case of emergency, they are taken to specialists at major city hospitals.

There is a sick room, every students are allowed to visit sick room if they feel they are unwell. Sick room consists of health advisors and if case is serious the guardians are called and transportation are managed by the school to close hospitals.

References

Schools in Kathmandu
1986 establishments in Nepal